This is an episode list for the BBC television sitcom It Ain't Half Hot Mum by Jimmy Perry and David Croft, broadcast between 3 January 1974, and 3 September 1981.

It Ain't Half Hot Mum episodes were filmed between 1973 and 1981 with a break in 1979.

Series 1 to 4 took place in Deolali, India, while series 5 to 8 took place in Tin Min, Burma.

All episodes are 30 minutes long.

The episodes "A Star is Born" and "It's a Wise Child" no longer exist in their complete form as their original master tapes were wiped by the BBC shortly after their repeat broadcasts. Australian off-air VHS copies of both episodes, cut for screening on a commercial channel, were discovered in 1988. They are not of broadcast quality, but were included as extras on the series 1 DVD.

Series overview

Episodes

Series 1 (1974)

Series 2 (1975)

Series 3 (1976)

Series 4 (1976)

Series 5 (1977)

Series 6 (1978)

Series 7 (1980)

Series 8 (1981)

External links
 
 

Episode list using the default LineColor
It Ain't Half Hot Mum episodes